James Dudley Andrew (born July 28, 1945) is an American film theorist. He is R. Selden Rose Professor of Film and Comparative Literature at Yale University, where he has taught since the year 2000. Before moving to Yale, he taught for thirty years at the University of Iowa. Andrew has been called, on the occasion of one of his invited lecture series, "one of the most influential scholars in the areas of theory, history and criticism".  He particularly specializes in world cinema, film theory and aesthetics, and French cinema. He has also written on Japanese cinema, especially the work of Kenji Mizoguchi. He has been given a Guggenheim Fellowship and was named an Officier of the Ordre des Arts et des Lettres by the French Ministry of Culture. He was elected a Fellow of  the American Academy of Arts and Sciences in 2006. In 2011, he received the Society for Cinema and Media Studies Distinguished Career Achievement Award. Also he has been honored in some countries where his works has been translated and used as textbook in the field. In December 2020, University of Tehran held a session in honor of Dudley Andrew with his presence as the keynote speaker. In this session Nadia Maftouni called Andrew a successful scholar in forming a whole new academic field. Dudley Andrew is currently chair of the Department of Comparative Literature at Yale.

Selected publications
 The Major Film Theories. Oxford, New York: Oxford University Press, 1976.
 André Bazin.  New York: Oxford University Press, 1978. 
 Concepts in Film Theory. Oxford, New York: Oxford University Press, 1984.
 Film in the Aura of Art. Princeton: Princeton University Press, 1986
 Breathless: Jean-Luc Godard, Director. (Rutgers Films in Print series). Rutgers University Press, 1988.
 Mists of Regret: Culture and Sensibility in Classic French Film. Princeton: Princeton University Press, 1995.  
 Editor, The Image in Dispute: Art and Cinema in the Age of Photography. Austin: University of Texas Press, 1997.
 co-author with Carole Cavanaugh. Sansho Dayu (Sansho the Bailiff) (BFI Film Classics). British Film Institute, 2000. 
 co-author with Steven Ungar. Popular Front Paris and the Poetics of Culture. Cambridge: Harvard University Press, 2005.
 What Cinema Is! UK: Wiley-Blackwell, 2010
 Editor, Opening Bazin: Postwar Film Theory and Its Afterlife. Oxford University Press, 2011
 Editor and Translator, André Bazin's New Media. University of California Press, 2014

References

1945 births
Fellows of the American Academy of Arts and Sciences
Film theorists
Living people
Officiers of the Ordre des Arts et des Lettres
Yale University faculty